École nationale supérieure d'ingénieurs Sud-Alsace (ENSISA) a French engineering College created in 2006.

The school trains engineers for careers in research and development, production, quality management and distribution.

Located in Mulhouse, the ENSISA is a public higher education institution. The school is a member of the University of Upper Alsace.

References

External links
 ENSISA

Engineering universities and colleges in France
Mulhouse
ENSISA
Educational institutions established in 2006
2006 establishments in France